In the Møde is the second studio album by English drum and bass group Roni Size & Reprazent, released on 9 October 2000 on the Talkin' Loud label. The follow-up to the group's 1997 Mercury Music Prize-winning album New Forms, In the Møde featured guest appearances from Method Man, Rahzel and Rage Against the Machine frontman Zack de la Rocha.

Background and recording
Roni Size & Reprazent released their debut album, New Forms, in June 1997 to critical acclaim and commercial success, peaking at number 8 in the UK Album Chart. After winning the 1997 Mercury Music Prize, the group found international fame and became an in-demand live band. Size donated the £25,000 prize money to the Bristol youth centre where he had learned to program a drum machine. Writing for In the Møde began at rehearsals for their live tour, where the band would create new music by jamming using samplers and live instruments. This new music saw Reprazent relying on fewer jazz influences and moving towards a harder hip-hop-influenced sound.

Release
The album was preceded by the release of the single "Who Told You" on 25 September, which reached number 17 on the UK Singles Chart and was promoted by a music video directed by Hype Williams. The tracks "Dirty Beats" and "Lucky Pressure" were also released as singles.

Reception

Commercial performance
In the Møde entered the UK Albums Chart during the week ending 21 October 2000 and peaked at number 15. In the United States, the album reached number 10 on the Heatseekers Albums chart and number 181 on the Billboard 200 chart.

Critical response

In the Møde was released to some critical acclaim. At Metacritic, which assigns a weighted average score out of 100 to reviews and ratings from mainstream critics, the album received a score of 79, based on 16 reviews, indicating "generally favourable reviews."

AllMusic rated In the Møde four stars out of five, though reviewer John Bush noted that "the highlights are over far too quickly, and the weaker tracks never should have appeared in the first place." Marc Savlov, writing for The Austin Chronicle, awarded the album three stars out of five saying that it was "packed to bursting with arcane beats and skittery jungle rhythms" but remarked that it was "not so much out of date as it is out of time." The A.V. Club'''s Joshua Klein described In the Møde as "another volley of stylish drum-and-bass", though he noted that it "suffers a bit from overkill." Writing for Drowned in Sound, reviewer Chris Nettleton wished for "more variety of tone" and awarded the album six out of ten. A review in the NME described the album as "an example of fierce, righteous, and...fearlessly British innovation." and stated that "Roni Size and Reprazent are leaders in a field of one", awarding a score of seven out of ten. Vibe magazine writer Jon Caramanica opined that In the Møde "just regurgitates old forms" and rated the album two and a half stars out of five. Robert Christgau, writing for The Village Voice, gave the album an A rating, noting that "the album moves the way you always hope jungle will, like a cross between a tiger and a snake."

Track listing

Personnel
All personnel credits adapted from In the Møde''s liner notes.

Reprazent
Roni Size – Keyboards, programming, production, recording
Krust – Keyboards, programming, production, recording
DJ Die – Keyboards, programming, production, recording
Suv – Engineering, programming, production, recording
Onallee – vocals
Dynamite MC – vocals

Recording personnel
Dave Amso – mixing engineer, recording engineer, Pro Tools
Lou Ortez – mixing engineer, recording engineer
Steve Solar – recording engineer, Pro Tools
Stuart Hawkes – mastering

Additional personnel
Michael Williams – art direction
Tim Bret-Day – photography

Additional performers
Ben Watt – guitar
Si John – bass
Rob Merrill – drums
Spry – percussion
Max Richter – strings
Alex Byron-Collins – piano
Joe Allen – bass
Method Man – vocals
Zack de la Rocha – vocals
Rahzel – vocals

References

Roni Size albums
2000 albums
Talkin' Loud albums